Igoris Morinas (born 21 February 1975) is a Lithuanian former international footballer.

Career 
Morinas previously played for Hannover 96, 1. FSV Mainz 05 and Jahn Regensburg in the German 2. Bundesliga.

Honours
 Baltic Cup: 1997, 2005

References

External links
 

1976 births
Living people
Lithuanian footballers
Lithuania international footballers
FK Žalgiris players
Hannover 96 players
1. FSV Mainz 05 players
SSV Jahn Regensburg players
Expatriate footballers in Germany
FK Panerys Vilnius players
A Lyga players
2. Bundesliga players
Lithuanian people of Russian descent
Association football midfielders